The Compact Disc-Interactive (CD-I, later CD-i) is a digital optical disc data storage format that was mostly developed and marketed by Dutch company Philips. It was created as an extension of CDDA and CD-ROM and specified in the Green Book specifications, co-developed by Philips and Sony, to combine audio, text and graphics. The two companies initially expected to impact the education/training, point of sale, and home entertainment industries, but CD-i eventually became best known for its video games.

CD-i players were usually standalone boxes that connect to a standard television; some less common setups included integrated CD-i television sets and expansion modules for personal computers. Most players were created by Philips; the format was licensed by Philips and Microware for use by other manufacturers, notably Sony who released professional CD-i players under the "Intelligent Discman" brand. Unlike CD-ROM drives, CD-i players are complete computer systems centered around dedicated Motorola 68000-based microprocessors and its own operating system called CD-RTOS, which is an acronym for "Compact Disc – Real Time Operating System".

Media released on the format included video games and "edutainment" and multimedia reference titles, such as interactive encyclopedias and museum tours – which were popular before public Internet access was widespread – as well as business software. Philips's CD-i system also implemented Internet features, including subscriptions, web browsing, downloading, e-mail, and online play. Philips's aim with its players was to introduce interactive multimedia content for the general public by combining features of a CD player and game console, but at a lower price than a personal computer with a CD-ROM drive.

Initially marketed to consumers as "home entertainment systems", and in later years as a "gaming platform", CD-i did not manage to find enough success in the market, and was mostly abandoned by Philips in 1996. The format continued to be supported for licensees for a few more years after.

Specifications
Development of the "Compact Disc-Interactive" format began in 1984 (two years after the launch of Compact Disc) and it was first publicly announced by Philips and Sony – two of the largest electronics companies of the time – at Microsoft's CD-ROM Conference in Seattle in March 1986. Microsoft's CEO Bill Gates had no idea beforehand that the format was under development. The Green Book, formally known as the "CD-i Full Functional Specification", defined the format for interactive, multimedia compact discs designed for CD-i players. The Green Book specification also defines a whole hardware set built around the Motorola 68000 microprocessor family, and an operating system called CD-RTOS based on OS-9, a product of Microware. The standard was originally not freely available and had to be licensed from Philips. However, the 1994 version of the standard was eventually made available free by Philips.

CD-i discs conform to the Red Book specification of audio CDs (CD-DA). Tracks on a CD-i's program area can be CD-DA tracks or CD-i tracks, but the first track must always be a CD-i track, and all CD-i tracks must be grouped together at the beginning of the area. CD-i tracks are structured according to the CD-ROM XA specification (using either Mode 2 Form 1 or Mode 2 Form 2 modes), and have different classes depending on their contents ("data", "video", "audio", "empty" and "message"). "Message" sectors contain audio data to warn users of CD players that the track they are trying to listen to is a CD-i track and not a CD-DA track. The CD-i specification also specifies a file system similar to (but not compatible with) ISO 9660 to be used on CD-i tracks, as well as certain specific files that are required to be present in a CD-i compatible disc. Compared to the Yellow Book (specification for CD-ROM), the Green Book CD-i standard solves synchronisation problems by interleaving audio and video information on a single track.

The format quickly gained interest from large manufacturers, and received backing from many particularly Matsushita. Although a joint effort, Philips eventually took over the majority of CD-i development at the expense of Sony. Philips invested many millions in developing titles and players based on the CD-i specification. Initially branded "CD-I", the name was changed in 1991 to "CD-i" with a lowercase i.

The CD-i Ready format is a type of bridge format, also designed by Philips, that defines discs compatible with CD Digital audio players and CD-i players. This format puts CD-i software and data into the pregap of Track 1.

The CD-i Bridge format, defined in Philips' White Book, is a transitional format allowing bridge discs to be played both on CD-ROM drives and on CD-i players.

The CD-i Digital Video format was launched in 1993 containing movies that could be played on CD-i players with a Digital Video Cartridge add-on. The format was incompatible with Video CD (VCD), although a CD-i unit with the DVC could play both formats. Only about 20 movies were released on the format and it was stopped in 1994 in favor of VCD.

Commercial software

Applications were developed using authoring software produced by OptImage. This included OptImage's Balboa Runtime Libraries and MediaMogul. The second company that produced authoring software was Script Systems; they produced ABCD-I. Much of the CD-i software were promoted and/or published by American Interactive Media (AIM), a joint venture between Philips and its subsidiary PolyGram formed in Los Angeles in 1986, before its public debut, to publish CD-i based consumer software. Similarly in Europe, Philips Interactive Media was launched.

Philips at first marketed CD-i as a family entertainment product, and avoided mentioning video games to not compete against game consoles. Early software releases focused heavily on educational, music, and self-improvement titles, with only a few games, many of them adaptations of board games such as Connect Four. However, the system was handily beaten in the market for multimedia devices by cheap low-end PCs, and the games were the best-selling software. By 1993 Philips encouraged MS-DOS and console developers to create games, introduced a $250 peripheral with more memory and support for full-motion video, and added to new consoles a second controller port for multiplayer games.

The attempts to develop a foothold in the games market were unsuccessful, as the system was designed strictly as a multimedia player and thus was under-powered compared to other gaming platforms on the market in most respects. Earlier CD-i games included entries in popular Nintendo franchises, although those games were not developed by Nintendo. Specifically, a Mario game (titled Hotel Mario), and three Legend of Zelda games that are now infamous were released: Zelda: The Wand of Gamelon, Link: The Faces of Evil and Zelda's Adventure. Nintendo and Philips had established an agreement to co-develop a CD-ROM enhancement for the Super Nintendo Entertainment System due to licensing disagreements with Nintendo's previous partner Sony (an agreement that produced a prototype console called the SNES-CD). While Philips and Nintendo never released such a CD-ROM add-on, Philips was still contractually allowed to continue using Nintendo characters.

As announced at CES 1992, a large number of full motion video titles such as Dragon's Lair and Mad Dog McCree appeared on the system. One of these, Burn:Cycle, is considered one of the stronger CD-i titles and was later ported to PC. The February 1994 issue of Electronic Gaming Monthly remarked that the CD-i's full motion video capabilities were its strongest point, and that nearly all of its best software required the MPEG upgrade card.

Philips also released several versions of popular TV game shows for the CD-i, including versions of Jeopardy! (hosted by Alex Trebek), Name That Tune (hosted by Bob Goen), and two versions of The Joker's Wild (one for adults hosted by Wink Martindale and one for kids hosted by Marc Summers). All CD-i games in North America (with the exception of Name That Tune) had Charlie O'Donnell as announcer. The Netherlands also released its version of Lingo on the CD-i in 1994.

In 1993, American musician Todd Rundgren created the first music-only fully interactive CD, No World Order, for the CD-i. This application allows the user to completely arrange the whole album in their own personal way with over 15,000 points of customization. Dutch eurodance duo 2 Unlimited released a CD-i compilation album in 1994 called "Beyond Limits" which contains standard CD tracks as well as CD-i-exclusive media on the disc.

CD-i had a series of learning games ("edutainment") targeted at children from infancy to adolescence. Those intended for a younger audience included Busytown, The Berenstain Bears and various others which usually had vivid cartoon-like settings accompanied by music and logic puzzles.

By mid-1996 the U.S. market for CD-i software had dried up and Philips had given up on releasing titles there, but continued to publish CD-i games in Europe, where the system still held some popularity from a video gaming perspective. With the home market exhausted, Philips tried with some success to position the technology as a solution for kiosk applications and industrial multimedia.

Some homebrew developers have released video games on the CD-i format in later years, such as Frog Feast (2005), Super Quartet (2018), and Nobelia (2022).

Player models
CD-i compatible models were released (as of April 1995) in the U.S., Canada, Benelux, France, Germany, the UK, Japan, Singapore, Hong Kong and former Eastern Bloc. It was reported to be released further in Brazil, India and Australia in the "coming months", with plans to also introduce it in China, South Africa, Indonesia and the Philippines.

Philips models

In addition to consumer models, professional and development players were sold by Philips Interactive Media Systems and their VARs. The first CD-i system was produced by Philips in collaboration with Kyocera in 1988 – the Philips 180/181/182 modular system. Philips marketed several CD-i player models as shown below.

The CD-i player 100 series, which consisted of the three-unit 180/181/182 professional system, first demonstrated at the CD-ROM Conference in March 1988.
The CD-i player 200 series, which includes the 205, 210, and 220 models. Models in the 200 series were designed for general consumption, and were available at major home electronics outlets around the world. The Philips CDI 910 is the American version of the CDI 205, the most basic model in the series and the first Philips CD-i model, released in December 1991.
The CD-i player 300 series, which includes the 310, 350, 360, and 370 models. The 300 series consists of portable players designed for the professional market and not marketed to home consumers. A popular use was multimedia sales presentations such as those used by pharmaceutical companies to provide product information to physicians, as the devices could be easily transported by sales representatives.
The CD-i player 400 series, which includes the 450, 470, 490 models. The 400 models are slimmed-down units aimed at console and educational markets. The CDI 450 player, for instance, is a budget model designed to compete with game consoles. In this version, an infrared remote controller is not standard but optional, as this model is more gaming-oriented.
The CD-i player 500 series, which includes the 550 model, which was essentially the same as the 450 with an installed digital video cartridge. It was introduced at CES Chicago in June 1994.
The CD-i player 600 series, which includes the 601, 602, 604, 605, 615, 660, and 670 models. The 600 series is designed for professional applications and software development. Units in this line generally include support for floppy disk drives, keyboards and other computer peripherals. Some models can also be connected to an emulator and have software testing and debugging features.
The CD-I player 700 series, which consists of the 740 model, the most advanced player and featuring an RS-232 port. It was only released in limited quantities.

There also exist a number of hard-to-categorize models, such as the FW380i, an integrated mini-stereo and CD-i player; the 21TCDi30, a television with a built-in CD-i device; the CD-i/PC 2.0, a CD-i module with an ISA interface for IBM-compatible 486 PCs.

Other manufacturers
In addition to Philips, several manufacturers produced CD-i players some of which were still on sale years after Philips itself abandoned the format. Manufacturers included:
Magnavox (a Philips subsidiary) made rebranded players for the American market. 
GoldStar / LG Electronics, the LG GDI-700 (c. 1997) was a professional player with a Motorola 68341 processor, faster than the Philips model. GoldStar had a portable player, including another small one without an LCD screen.
Digital Video Systems
Memorex
Grundig
Kyocera made the portable Pro 1000S model
Maspro Denkoh released a GPS car navigation system with a built-in CD-i player, released in Japan in 1992.
Saab Electric
Sony produced two models branded Intelligent Discman, a hybrid home/portable CD-i player released in 1990-1991 for professional use only.
NBS
International Interactive Media (I2m) released in 1995 a CD-i PCI expansion card for 486 PCs, Pentium PCs, 68k-based Macintosh and PowerPC-based Macintosh computers
Vobis Highscreen
Manna Space branded CD-i models (based on Magnavox's or GoldStar's version of Philips CDI 450) were made for a Japanese travel agency with the same name in 1995.
Bang & Olufsen, who produced a high-end television with a built-in CD-i device (Beocenter AV5) on the market from 1997-2001.

Before the actual commercial debut of the CD-i format, some other companies had interest in building players and some made prototypes, but were never released – this includes Panasonic (who were originally a major backer of the format),  Pioneer, JVC, Toshiba, Epson, Ricoh, Fujitsu, Samsung and Yamaha. In addition, Sanyo showed a prototype portable CD-i player in 1992.

Hardware specifications

TeleCD-i and CD-MATICS
Recognizing the growing need among marketers for networked multimedia, Philips partnered in 1992 with Amsterdam-based CDMATICS to develop TeleCD-i  (also TeleCD). In this concept, the CD-i player is connected to a network such as PSTN or Internet, enabling data-communication and rich media presentation. Dutch grocery chain Albert Heijn and mail-order company Neckermann were early adopters and introduced award-winning TeleCD-i applications for their home-shopping and home-delivery services. CDMATICS also developed the special Philips TeleCD-i Assistant and a set of software tools to help the worldwide multimedia industry to develop and implement TeleCD-i. TeleCD-i is the world's first networked multimedia application at the time of its introduction. In 1996, Philips acquired source code rights from CDMATICS.

CD-Online

Internet services on the CD-i devices were facilitated by the use of an additional hardware modem and "CD-Online" disc (renamed Web-i in the US), which Philips initially released in Britain in 1995 for $150 US. This service provided the CD-i with full internet access (with a 14.4k modem), including online shopping, email, and support for networked multiplayer gaming on select CD-i games. The service required a CD-i player with DV cartridge, and an "Internet Starter Kit" which initially retailed for  £99.99. It was advertised as bringing "full Internet access to the living room on TV screens". Andy Stout, a writer for the official CD-i magazine, explained CD-Online:  The CD-Online service went live in the UK on October 25, 1995 and in March 1996 in the Netherlands (for 399 guilders), and also released in Belgium. The system was reportedly scheduled to launch in the US as "Web-i" in August 1996. The domain cd-online.co.uk, which was used for the British CD-Online service, went offline in 2000. The Dutch domain cd-online.nl stopped updating too but remained online until 2007.

Only one game was released that supported CD-Online, the first-person shooter game RAM Raid. Players from any country in the world could compete against each other as long as they had a copy of the game.

Reception and market performance
Philips had invested heavily in the CD-i format and system, and it was often compared with the Commodore CDTV as a single combination of computer, CD, and television. The product was touted as a single machine for home entertainment connected to a standard TV and controlled by a regular remote control – although the format was noted to have various non-entertainment business opportunities too, such as travel and tourism or the military. In 1990, Peugeot used CD-i for its point of sale application promoting its then-new 605 automobile, and it was also at the time used by fellow car manufacturer Renault for staff training programmes, and in Japan by the Ministry of Trade and Industry for an exhibition there. A Philips executive, Gaston Bastiaens, quoted in 1990 "CD-I will be 'the medium' for entertainment, education and information in the 90's.". Sony introduced its three portable CD-i players in June 1990, pitching them as "picture books with sound".

The ambitious CD-i format had initially created much interest after its 1986 announcement, both in the west and in Japan, buoyed by the success of the CD. However, after repeated delays (hardware were first intended to be ready and shipped by Christmas 1987) interest was slowly lost. Electronic Arts for instance was enthusiastic about CD-i and formed a division for the development of video game titles on the format, but it was eventually halted with the intention of resuming when CD-i players would reach the market. The company eventually never resumed CD-i software development when it was released. The delay also gave more attention to the hyped Digital Video Interactive (DVI) in 1987, which demonstrated full screen, full motion video (FMV) using a compression chip on an IBM PC/AT computer. Amid the attention around its potential rival DVI, Philips and Sony decided to find a way to add full screen FMV abilities to the CD-i standard, causing further delay. Meanwhile, the Microsoft-backed CD-ROM standard was improving and solved certain video playback issues that were present on the CD-i – CD-ROM format products were already on the market by 1987. At the end, CD-ROM standard benefited from the CD-i and DVI mishaps, and by the time CD-i players for consumers were released in 1991, CD-ROM had already become known and established. Ron Gilbert commented in early 1990 "The CD-I specifications look great, but where are the machines? If they'd come out four years ago, they'd have been hot, but now they're behind the times." Another reason that led to fading interest pre-launch was the fact CD-i players would not launch with FMV but instead receive it later through a purchasable add-on cartridge (it was originally expected to come built-in) – as well as the obsolete Motorola processor, OS-9 software, and a launch price considered high.

Although Philips had aggressively promoted their CD-i products in the U.S., by August 1993 Computer Gaming World reported that "skepticism persists about its long-term prospects" compared to other platforms like IBM PC compatibles, Apple Macintosh, and Sega Genesis. The magazine stated in January 1994 that despite Philips' new emphasis on games "CD-i is still not the answer for hardcore gamers", but the console "may yet surprise us all in the future". It recommended the CD-i with video cartridge for those needing to buy a new console as "The price is right and there is more software to support it", but 3DO Interactive Multiplayer was probably better for those who could wait a few months. The Electronic Entertainment August 1994 issue noted that the CD-i, along with the Atari Jaguar, neither have an "effective, let alone innovative" game library to compete against the then newly released Sega CD.

After being outsold in the market by cheaper multimedia PCs, in 1994 Philips attempted to emphasize CD-i as a game playing machine, but this did not help the situation. An early 1995 review of the system in GamePro stated that "inconsistent game quality puts the CD-i at a disadvantage against other high-powered game producers." A late 1995 review in Next Generation criticized both Philips's approach to marketing the CD-i and the hardware itself ("The unit excels at practically nothing except FMV, and then only with the addition of a $200 digital video cartridge"). The magazine noted that while Philips had not yet officially discontinued the CD-i, it was dead for all intents and purposes, citing as evidence the fact that though Philips had a large booth at the 1995 Electronic Entertainment Expo, there was no CD-i hardware or software on display. Next Generation scored the console one out of five stars. Another trouble for Philips in 1995 was the formation of HDCD, which promised better quality video compared to Video CD's (VCD) MPEG-1 compression method – Philips had heavily promoted the CD-i's VCD playing capabilities. Philips Media consolidated its CD-i activities from its Los Angeles office in March 1996. It was reported in October 1996 that Philips was ready to "call it quits" in the American market.

Sales
In October 1994, Philips claimed an installed base of one million units for the CD-i worldwide. In 1996, The Wall Street Journal reported that total US sales amounted to 400,000 units. In the Netherlands, about 60,000 CD-i players were sold by the end of December 1994.

Legacy

Although extensively marketed by Philips, notably via infomercial, consumer interest in CD-i titles remained low. By 1994, sales of CD-i systems had begun to slow, and in 1998 the product line was dropped. Plans for a second generation CD-i system were certainly present and Argonaut Software was even designated to design chip sets for the successor to the CD-i. However, the then president Cor Boonstra saw no interest in the media area for Philips and so Philips sold everything, including the media subsidiary Polygram. The Dutch half of Philips Media was sold to Softmachine, which released The Lost Ride on the CD-i as the last product for the CD-i. Philips then also sold its French half of the gaming subsidiary, Philips Media BV, to French publisher Infogrames in 1997 along with the entire CD-i library. A CD-ROM add-on for the Super NES, which was announced for development with Nintendo in 1991, was never made. The last CD-i game was made by Infogrames, who released  Solar Crusade in 1999.

After its discontinuation, the CD-i was overwhelmingly panned by critics who blasted its graphics, games, and controls. Microsoft CEO Bill Gates admitted that initially he "was worried" about the CD-i due to Philips' heavy support for the device and its two-pronged attack on both the games console and PC markets, but that in retrospect, "It was a device that kind of basically got caught in the middle. It was a terrible game machine, and it was a terrible PC." The CD-i's various controllers were ranked the fifth worst video game controller by IGN editor Craig Harris. PC World ranked it as fourth on their list of "The 10 Worst Video Game Systems of All Time". Gamepro.com listed it as number four on their list of The 10 Worst-Selling Consoles of All Time. In 2008, CNET listed the system on its list of the worst game console(s) ever. In 2007, GameTrailers ranked the Philips CD-i as the fourth worst console of all time in its Top 10 Worst Console lineup.

In later retrospective years, the CD-i has become (infamously) best known for its video games, particularly those from the Nintendo-licensed The Legend of Zelda series, considered by many to be of poor taste. Games that were most heavily criticized include Hotel Mario, Link: The Faces of Evil, Zelda: The Wand of Gamelon, and Zelda's Adventure. EGM's Seanbaby rated The Wand of Gamelon as one of the worst video games of all time. However, Burn:Cycle was positively received by critics and has often been held up as the standout title for the CD-i.

See also

CD-i Ready
High Sierra Format
3DO Interactive Multiplayer
MiniDisc
CD-ROM
Video CD
Super NES CD-ROM
Digital Video Interactive
Commodore CDTV
Pioneer LaserActive
Sega CD
FM Towns
Tandy Video Information System
NEC TurboDuo

References

External links

Official Philips CD-I FAQ
CD-i history
CD-i hardware

1990s toys
Audio storage
 
CD-ROM-based consoles
Compact disc
Computer-related introductions in 1990
Home video game consoles
Fourth-generation video game consoles
Joint ventures
Philips products
Sony products
Products introduced in 1990
Products and services discontinued in 1998
Regionless game consoles
Video storage
68k-based game consoles